Fu Chronicles is the seventh studio album by American band Antibalas. Written and conceptualized by lead singer Duke Amayo, who also illustrated the album cover. It was released on February 7, 2020 under Daptone.

In support of the album, the band announced a tour.

Critical reception
Fu Chronicles was met with generally favorable reviews from critics. At Metacritic, which assigns a weighted average rating out of 100 to reviews from mainstream publications, this release received an average score of 80, based on 4 reviews. It was nominated for the Grammy Award for Best Global Music Album.

Track listing

References

2020 albums
Daptone Records albums